United Presbyterian Church is an historic Presbyterian church located at Lisbon in St. Lawrence County, New York. It was built in 1857 and is a rectangular gable roofed frame building, three bays wide and four bays deep.  It was modified and enlarged in the late 19th century and early 20th century.  Attached to the main block is a two-story Sunday school wing.

It was listed on the National Register of Historic Places in 2007.

References

Churches on the National Register of Historic Places in New York (state)
Presbyterian churches in New York (state)
Churches completed in 1857
19th-century Presbyterian church buildings in the United States
Churches in St. Lawrence County, New York
National Register of Historic Places in St. Lawrence County, New York
1857 establishments in New York (state)